Strandabyggð is a municipality located in northwestern Iceland.

References

Municipalities of Iceland
Westfjords